Michael Richards, better known as Adisa Andwele, is a rhythm poet from Barbados. Adisa has performed at many different places such as, pubs, theatres, music and literature festivals, schools, day centres for senior citizens and Buckingham Palace. He has earned many achievements during his career; Hackney Poet Laureate and a winner of 'New Performance Poet of the Year'. In 2009 and 2010, Adisa toured England with his one person show: '1968 - The Year That Never Ended'. Some of the countries he has performed in are, Switzerland, Botswana, Italy, Nigeria and Sweden.

Biography
Born in Rock Hall, St. Thomas, Richards first found fame in the late 1970s with the poetry collection Whispers in the Spirit. He began working with musicians, incorporating Caribbean rhythms with his poems, and appeared with the Re-emergence band. A second collection, Rhythm an' Roots, was published in 1989, and Richards became the first poet to stage a solo performance in Barbados in 1990. In 1991 the album Mike Richards and the Re-Emergence Band Live was issued, and Richards was named Barbados Poet of the Year. A third collection of poetry, Black Distant Voice, was published in 1992, winning him the Author of the Year award. That year he adopted the stage name Adisa Andwele.

His second album, Conscious, was released in 1993, and he began performing in the US and Canada. He signed to Eddy Grant's Ice label in the mid-1990s and released the Doin' It Safe album in 1990, recorded with the band Jamari.

More recently, Andwele has acted as coordinator of the 'Soca Royale' competition.

Publications
Whispers in the Spirit (1979)
Rhythm an' Roots (1989)
Black Distant Voice (1992)
Riot in the Land
Antiquity (2002), Peepal Tree
Crop Over (2003), WOW Caribbean

Discography
Mike Richards and the Re-Emergence Band Live (1991)
Conscious (1993)
Doin' It Safe (2000), Ice

References

External links
 Adisa Andwele biography at Ice Records

Living people
Barbadian poets
Male poets
Barbadian male writers
People from Saint Thomas, Barbados
Year of birth missing (living people)